Nilton Rogério Cardoso Fernandes (born 7 March 1979), known simply as Nilton, is a Cape Verdean former footballer who played as a midfielder.

He spent most of his career in Portugal, amassing Primeira Liga totals of 110 matches and one goal with four teams.

Club career
Born in the island of Brava, Nilton played youth football with Portuguese club Boavista FC, who loaned him to Gondomar S.C. and AD Esposende to kickstart his senior career. Upon his return, he appeared in 12 Primeira Liga games in the 1999–2000 season, helping to a fourth-place finish.

In the following years, Nilton alternated between the top division and the Segunda Liga, representing C.D. Aves (where he scored his first goal, contributing to a 3–2 home win against C.F. Estrela da Amadora on 13 May 2001 as his team was eventually relegated), Gil Vicente FC, F.C. Marco, S.C. Salgueiros and F.C. Penafiel. He left the country in the summer of 2006, scoring a career-best six goals for FC Koper and winning the Slovenian Football Cup.

From 2007 until his retirement five years later, aged 33, Nilton played for Ethnikos Achna FC (Cyprus), NK Maribor (Slovenia), PFC Chernomorets Burgas (Bulgaria), Akritas Chlorakas (Cypriot Second Division) and Maccabi Ironi Bat Yam FC (Israeli second level).

Honours
Koper
Slovenian Football Cup: 2006–07

Maribor
Slovenian PrvaLiga: 2008–09

External links

1979 births
Living people
People from Brava, Cape Verde
Cape Verdean footballers
Association football midfielders
Primeira Liga players
Liga Portugal 2 players
Segunda Divisão players
Boavista F.C. players
Gondomar S.C. players
A.D. Esposende players
C.D. Aves players
Gil Vicente F.C. players
F.C. Marco players
S.C. Salgueiros players
F.C. Penafiel players
Slovenian PrvaLiga players
FC Koper players
NK Maribor players
Cypriot First Division players
Cypriot Second Division players
Ethnikos Achna FC players
Akritas Chlorakas players
First Professional Football League (Bulgaria) players
PFC Chernomorets Burgas players
Liga Leumit players
Cape Verde international footballers
Cape Verdean expatriate footballers
Expatriate footballers in Portugal
Expatriate footballers in Slovenia
Expatriate footballers in Cyprus
Expatriate footballers in Bulgaria
Expatriate footballers in Israel
Cape Verdean expatriate sportspeople in Portugal
Cape Verdean expatriate sportspeople in Bulgaria